Sean Chambers (born February 27, 1965) is a retired American professional basketball player, best known for being a resident import of the Alaska Aces basketball team in the Philippine Basketball Association from 1989–2001.

Early life
Beginning his collegiate career at Cuesta College, Chambers led the Cougars to a 20-11 season as a sophomore, highlighted by averaging 22.8 points per game.

A back-to-back CCAA Player of the Year and 1986 third-team NABC All-American while playing for Cal Poly, Chambers was asked to try out for the United States Athletics team to the 1988 Seoul Olympics but preferred to stick to basketball. 

He once held the record in high jump for the Grant Union School District, with a top lifetime clearance of 7 feet, 1.25 inches, which ranked as the country's fourth-leading prep high jump in 1983 (attracting a recruiting offer for track & field from Florida State before he elected to fully play basketball).

Professional basketball career 
Standing 6-foot-2, Chambers went to Manila with the Los Angeles Jaguars to play in the first PBA-IBA World Challenge series. In a sideshow, Chambers topped the special slam dunk competition. He went back the following year with the Jaguars and in 1989 PBA First Conference, he was hired by then Alaska coach Bogs Adornado to replace Carl Lott as their import.

In 1991, Chambers led the Alaska Milkmen to their first-ever PBA championship, and finally got an award when he was named only the second recipient of the Mr. 100% award. Norman Black won the award in 1983. For the whole of 1991 PBA season, Chambers averaged 37.7 points in two conferences in a total of 34 games. He played 10 more seasons in the PBA with Alaska, and had the most titles among imports tied with Justin Brownlee, including a grand slam in 1996.

PBA career statistics

Season-by-season averages

Post-basketball career
He now works at Fern Bacon Middle School as the Dean of Students.

References

1965 births
Living people
Alaska Aces (PBA) players
American expatriate basketball people in Australia
American expatriate basketball people in Japan
American expatriate basketball people in the Philippines
American expatriate basketball people in Venezuela
American men's basketball players
Cal Poly Mustangs men's basketball players
Junior college men's basketball players in the United States
Philippine Basketball Association imports
Philippine Basketball Association players with retired numbers
Power forwards (basketball)